Božidar "Božo" Beravs (born December 24, 1948) is a former Slovenian ice hockey player. He played for the Yugoslavia men's national ice hockey team at the 1972 Winter Olympics in Sapporo and the 1976 Winter Olympics in Innsbruck.

His older brother, Slavko Beravs, played for the Yugoslav national ice hockey team at the 1968 and 1972 Winter Olympics.

References

1948 births
Living people
Ice hockey players at the 1972 Winter Olympics
Ice hockey players at the 1976 Winter Olympics
Olympic ice hockey players of Yugoslavia
Slovenian ice hockey defencemen
Sportspeople from Ljubljana
Yugoslav ice hockey defencemen
HDD Olimpija Ljubljana players